Shashikala Dahal (Nepali: शशिकला दाहाल) is a Nepalese communist politician and Vice Chairperson of the National Assembly. In 2018, she was elected unopposed in Province No. 2 for the Communist Party of Nepal (Maoist Centre) with a four-year term.

References 

Nepal Communist Party (NCP) politicians
Members of the National Assembly (Nepal)
Communist Party of Nepal (Maoist Centre) politicians
People from Mahottari District
Living people
1957 births